The U.S. Post Office (now known as the Woonsocket YMCA) is a historic former post office building at 295 Main Street in Woonsocket, Rhode Island.  The single-story masonry building was built 1910-12 and served as Woonsocket's main post office until 1975.

The building was added to the National Register of Historic Places in 1979.  It is now part of the Woonsocket YMCA.

See also
National Register of Historic Places listings in Providence County, Rhode Island

References

External links
Woonsocket YMCA Website

 Buildings and structures in Woonsocket, Rhode Island
 Government buildings completed in 1910
 Government buildings on the National Register of Historic Places in Rhode Island
Woonsocket
 Clubhouses in Rhode Island
Post office buildings in Rhode Island
National Register of Historic Places in Providence County, Rhode Island